Balak, باڵەک, Balek is an ancient Kurdish tribe living in the former Soran Emirate which is now part of Erbil Governorate in Southern Kurdistan. it is located in the mountainous region of northern Erbil Governorate in Southern Kurdistan. People from the Balak area speak a language that is mixed in the Kurdish Sorani dialect and the Kurdish Kurmanji dialect. Like most Kurdish tribes, the people from the Balak tribe mainly live in mountains. Balak area ranges from Rawanduz district in the southwest, to the Haji Omaran sub-district in the northeast. There are a total two main districts located in Balak; namely Choman and Rawanduz, and five sub-districts: Warte, Smilan, Galala, Qasre and Haji Omaran. It is located 120 km north of Erbil, the capital of the Erbil Governorate and borders Eastern Kurdistan region in Iran.

Choman is considered the capital of the Balak tribe nowadays. Rawanduz was the capital of the Emirate of Soran, which was based in the geographic region of Kurdistan, specifically in what is today known as Southern Kurdistan. The emirate gained its full independence from the Ottoman Empire shortly after its capture from Safavid control in the 1530s. It was later reincorporated into the Ottoman Empire and served as a semi-autonomous vassal state for two centuries. The emirate slowly regained full independence for a second time during the late 18th century and early 19th century, but was once again eventually subdued by Ottoman troops in 1835. The city of Rawanduz served as the capital during most of its reign.

During his travels across Kurdistan in October and November 1836, Major Rawlinson observes that the Mîr of Rawanduz, Muhammad Pasha, brought tribesmen under his sway and conscripted a male from each family into his service as was his usual custom, and that the Balak tribe contingent proved to of great service to him.

The Name 
The name of the Balak tribe came from the area that they inhabit. The earliest mention of Balak tribe comes from a 14th-century book, Masalik al-absar fi mamalik al-amsar, authored by the Arab geographer Ibn Fadl Allah Al-'Omari, the name Balak is said to be derived from Balakan village in Northern Kurdistan. Balakan means "Home of the Balaks". The Balaks are also mentioned by the Ottoman Sharif Pasha who writes in his report that some clans of the Balak reside in Zooka and Mashkan regions of Northern Kurdistan. The Balak Tribe are also mentioned in the Seyahatname by Evliya Çelebi.

Notables and Tribe Rulers

Leaders and notables from Mala Sharafi Clan (Balak)
 Mala Sharaf Landlord and Chief of Balak tribe. 17th Century.
  Mustafa Agha Nawpirdani, the most popular leader of the Balak Tribe, he came from a nationalist family and started off as a Peshmerga at the revolts in his area of Balakayati the Aylul Revolution in 1974 and continued on till 1983. Then he went undercover into the Iraqi Government and became Commander of the 33rd Regiment and the 48th special detachment of the Iraqi Army (estimated to be nearly 6,000 soldiers) all under his command working undercover for the Peshmerga, due to continuous support and aid for the KDP and PUK Peshmerga’s through weapons, equipment, money, and medical supplies. He was improvised, imprisoned, and was sentenced to death, but was luckily granted a presidential pardon and ended up serving three years in the notorious Abu Ghraib prison. After being released, through his strong connections and relations with the KDP leadership, he rejoined the Peshmerga and regrouped his tribes forces and Peshmerga’s (estimated to be 3,000 soldiers) with which he planned and participated the uprisings against Saddam Hussein’s regime. On 11 March 1991, after fighting numerous heroic battles in Erbil, in which he captured Pirzin and Shaways from the Baathist forces. He died during an ambush on his convoy on the way to the Citadel of Erbil, becoming the first martyr of Erbils Raparin. His legacy still lives on in the Balak tribe, he's often named the charismatic irreplaceable leader and he still hasn't been replaced to this day.
 Shaikh Muhammad Agha (Died in 1952) Balak's most powerful Leader. Established good relations with both the British Government and the King of Iraq. He became a member of the Iraqi Parliament in 1938.
 Shemhamad Balak, prominent Peshmerga commander, former Politburo member of PASOK.
 Hasan Kwestani (1950-1994) Prominent Peshmarga Leader in Patriotic Union of Kurdistan. He was assassinated by the KDP on 17 May 1994.

Other notables
 Hamadamin Nawpirdani, Senior Cadre in the Kurdistan Democratic Party and official in the Kurdistan Regional Government, Former Director of Education of the Kurdish Capital of Erbil, and the brother of Mustafa Nawpirdani.
 Nafiz Mustafa Nawpirdani, Member and head of oil and gas commission in the Erbil Provincial Council, high status member in the Patriotic Union of Kurdistan, and the eldest son of the late leader Mustafa Nawpirdani. 
 Sheikh Muhammad Balak, a leader of the Suhrawardiyya Sufi order in the 17th century.
 Azad Jundiani (1960) Senior Advisor of President Barzani 
 Hemin Malazade anchorman. at Rudaw TV and 24/7 Kurdish News Channel

References

Erbil Governorate
Kurdish tribes